Flight 149 may refer to:

Ansett-ANA Flight 149, crashed on 22 September 1966
British Airways Flight 149, hijacked on 2 August 1990

0149